James Albert Duffy (September 13, 1873 – February 12, 1968) was an American prelate of the Roman Catholic Church who served as the first bishop of the Diocese of Grand Island in Nebraska from 1917 to 1931. He previously served as bishop of the Diocese of Kearney in Nebraska from 1913 until its dissolution in 1917.

Biography

Early life 
James Duffy was born on September 13, 1873, in St. Paul, Minnesota, the third child of James J. Duffy and Johanna Shiely. When the death of the parents in 1879 orphaned the eight Duffy children, James Albert Duffy went to live at the Boys Orphan Asylum in Minneapolis. From 1887 to 1893, he was a student at the University of St. Thomas and subsequently attended Saint Paul Seminary School of Divinity from 1894 to 1899.

Priesthood 
Duffy was ordained into the priesthood on May 27, 1899, for the Archdiocese of St. Paul in St. Paul, Minnesota, by Archbishop John Ireland. Following his ordination, Duffy served as a priest at Immaculate Conception Parish in Minneapolis (1899-1902) and at St. Anne's Parish in Le Sueur, Minnesota (1902-1904). In 1904, he became rector at the cathedral parish of St. Mary's in Cheyenne, Wyoming, under Bishop James J. Keane, and subsequently authored the article on the Diocese of Cheyenne for the Catholic Encyclopedia.

Bishop of Grand Island 

On January 27, 1913, Pope Pius X appointed Duffy as the first bishop of the Diocese of Kearney (which became the Diocese of Grand Island in 1917).  Duffy was consecrated by Archbishop James J. Keane on April 13, 1913. Duffy oversaw construction of the Cathedral of St. Mary from 1926 to 1928, and also established the Nebraska Register.

Retirement and legacy 
On June 5, 1931, Pope Pius XI accepted Duffy's early retirement as bishop of Grand Island due to poor health and appointed him as titular bishop of Silandus.

Duffy died on February 12, 1968, at St. Joseph's Infirmary in Hot Springs, Arkansas, and was buried in Calvary Cemetery, Grand Island, Nebraska. At the time of his death, he was the most senior bishop in the United States in both age and years of consecration.

References

1873 births
1968 deaths
Clergy from Saint Paul, Minnesota
Roman Catholic Archdiocese of Saint Paul and Minneapolis
20th-century Roman Catholic bishops in the United States
Roman Catholic bishops of Grand Island
Religious leaders from Minnesota
Contributors to the Catholic Encyclopedia